The Yorkshire & Humber Merit League is a rugby league competition for clubs in Yorkshire and the Humber. It is a feeder league for the Rugby League Conference.

History

The Midlands Merit League was founded in late 2005 to support the growth of rugby league in non-heartland areas. Originally intended as a stand-alone league, support from the Rugby Football League meant that it could be administered as part of the Rugby League Conference organisation. Interest quickly gathered with 13 teams looking to participate in the inaugural season - eight eventually participated. The first game took place on 8 April 2006 at All Saints Sports College, Sheffield, where the Sheffield Forgers beat the Chesterfield Spires by 58 points to 8.

The league was renamed Rugby League Merit League (RLML) for the 2008 season due to its increased geographical spread with teams from the North of England taking part. 2009 saw the largest ever entry, with over 30 teams split into two leagues; "Yorkshire and Humber" and "North West" with the Midlands Rugby League becoming its own competition using merit league rules.

In 2010 the Yorkshire & Humber Merit League and North West Merit League became separate competitions.

Rugby League Conference Pyramid

 RLC National
 RLC Yorkshire Premier
 RLC Yorkshire & Lincolnshire
 Yorkshire & Humber Merit League

The Yorkshire & Humber Merit League is the lowest level on the Rugby League Conference pyramid for clubs in Yorkshire and the Humber.

2011 structure

 NB: Barnsley Broncos A failed to start the season in the Midlands Division

Participating teams by season
 2010: Barnsley Broncos A, Barton Bulldogs, Haworth Park A, Heavy Woollen Donkeys, Junior Saracens, Knaresborough, Leeds Akkies A, Moorends-Thorne Marauders A, Rotherham Giants A, South Humber Rabbitohs

Past winners

Midlands Merit League Championship

Midlands Merit League Shield

RL Merit League

Yorkshire & Humber Merit League

See also
 British rugby league system
 Rugby League Conference
 Yorkshire Men's League

External links
 Rugby League Conference official site

Rugby League Conference